This is the list of TV channels that are currently broadcasting in Vietnam via transmission methods (broadcast TV, pay TV...), including stopped channels, broadcasting.

National Broadcasting Networks

Vietnam Television (VTV)

Defunct channels

VTC TV Channels

Free-to-air TV channels of other press agencies

Local Television Stations Channels

Locals Television

District Stations channel

Old stations

Pay TV channels

VTVCab

SCTV

HTVC

K+

VTC (Broadcast stopped)

AVG

Hanoicab (HCATV)

Other

Foreign channels

Defunct channels

Local Stations Channels
In the past, some provincial radio and television stations have piloted the second, third, and second programs... Most of these channels mainly relay programs from Vietnam Television Station and Television Station. Ho Chi Minh City and foreign TV channels. These TV channels only broadcast for a short time, or only broadcast within the province.

District Stations channel 

In addition to operating local radio and television stations, there are also district and provincial radio and television stations across the country. These stations usually broadcast their TV programs on the frequency channel that continues to re-broadcast the program channels of Vietnam Television Station at a time frame of the day before. Currently, these stations have stopped broadcasting television after completing Television digitization in each locality, only broadcasting programs on the Internet, social networks and on local television.

Army TV channels
Local military television channels are broadcast in a number of provinces and cities in Vietnam such as Ninh Binh, Thai Binh, etc. via analog terrestrial television system from channel 13 VHF to channel 20 UHF. provincial military unit. Currently, these channels have stopped broadcasting before 2020.

Unavailable in Foreign Channel

See also 
Television and mass media in Vietnam
List of digital television stations in Vietnam
List of analog television stations in Vietnam

Notes

References

Vietnam

Television networks in Vietnam
Lists of mass media in Vietnam
Telecommunications in Vietnam
Television in Asia